Roland van Benthem (born 24 February 1968 in Emmeloord) is a Dutch politician and former civil servant. Being a member of the People's Party for Freedom and Democracy (Volkspartij voor Vrijheid en Democratie) he currently is mayor of Eemnes.

Biography 
Educated as a Chartered Accountant Van Benthem worked for the Tax and Customs Administration, at the Ministry of Finance as well as the Ministry of Foreign Affairs and at the Queen's Office.

From 1994 to 2005 he was a councillor of Zeist, which is a municipality of the province of Utrecht. From 2004 to 2007 he was a member of the States-Provincial of the province of Utrecht. On 1 September 2005 he became mayor of Eemnes, which also is a municipality of the province of Utrecht.

Being homosexual he was treasurer of LGBT organization COC Nederland from 2001 to 2004.

Decorations 
 Member of the Order of Orange-Nassau, 2007

See also 
 List of Dutch politicians

References 
  Burgemeester Eemnes herbenoemd (update), De Gooi- en Eemlander, August 10, 2011

External links 
  Mayor Roland van Benthem, Municipality of Eemnes website

1968 births
Living people
People from Eemnes
People from Emmeloord
Dutch accountants
Dutch civil servants
LGBT mayors of places in the Netherlands
Gay politicians
Mayors in Utrecht (province)
Municipal councillors of Zeist
Members of the Provincial Council of Utrecht
People's Party for Freedom and Democracy politicians
Members of the Order of Orange-Nassau
LGBT conservatism